Træna is a municipality in Nordland county, Norway. It is part of the Helgeland traditional region. The administrative centre of the municipality is the island/village of Husøya. Other population centres include Selvær and Sanna.

Fishing is the economic mainstay of Træna. Connections to mainland Norway are by means of boat and ferry. Routes are provided to Sandnessjøen, Nesna, and Stokkvågen. Each year Træna plays hosts a music festival called Traena Music Festival. The islands of Træna have been the site of a number of archeological discoveries, indicating that the island has been populated since the Stone Age.

The  municipality is the 352nd largest by area out of the 356 municipalities in Norway. Træna is the 353rd most populous municipality in Norway with a population of only 450.

As of October 2020, there are two regular boat departures per day; authorities have suggested having only one regular departure per day.

General information
The municipality of Træna was established on 1 January 1872 when it was separated from the municipality of Lurøy. Initially, Træna had 289 residents. The municipal borders have not changed since that time.

Name
The municipality is named after the island group of Træna (Old Norse: Þriðna). The name is probably derived from the number þrír which means "three" and then referring to three peaks on the island. Historically, the name was spelled Trænen.

Coat of arms
The coat of arms was granted on 24 July 1987. The official blazon is "Gules, three fish-hooks Or two over one". This means the arms have a red field (background) and the charge is three fishhooks made of bone from the Stone Age. The fishhooks have a tincture of argent which means they are commonly colored yellow, but if it is made out of metal, then gold is used. These hooks symbolize the importance of fishing in the municipality. They are based on the historic bone hooks found in the local cave Kirkhelleren on the island of Sanna. They are canting arms because there are three hooks and the name Træna originates from a word meaning number "three". The arms were designed by Jarle E. Henriksen.

Churches
The Church of Norway has one parish within the municipality of Træna. It is part of the Nord-Helgeland prosti (deanery) in the Diocese of Sør-Hålogaland.

Geography
The municipality consists of over one thousand small islands off the coast of Norway. Four of the islands are populated: Husøya, Selvær, Sanna, and Sandøy. The islands lie along the Trænfjorden to the southeast and the Norwegian Sea to the west. Træna Lighthouse is located in the southern part of the municipality.

Government
All municipalities in Norway, including Træna, are responsible for primary education (through 10th grade), outpatient health services, senior citizen services, unemployment and other social services, zoning, economic development, and municipal roads. The municipality is governed by a municipal council of elected representatives, which in turn elect a mayor.  The municipality falls under the Rana District Court and the Hålogaland Court of Appeal.

Municipal council
The municipal council of Træna is made up of 11 representatives that are elected to four year terms. The party breakdown of the council is as follows:

Mayor
The mayors of Træna (incomplete list):

1872–1884: Mikkel Paul Olsen
1885–1888: Jakob Jeppesen
1889–1890: Mikkel Paul Olsen
1891-1892: Jakob Jeppesen
1893–1896: Mikkel Paul Olsen
1897–1901: Jens Olsen
1902–1907: Johan Andersen
1908–1913: Jens Olsen
1914–1919: Ole Johan August Olsen
1920–1928: Anders Olsen
1929–1931: Magnus Olsen
1932–1937: Anders Olsen
1938–1939: Erling Aune
1941–1945: Anders Olsen
1945–1945: Aksel Sjøset
1946–1946: Rolf Røsok Olsen
1946–1947: Martin Sandøy
1948–1955: Anders Olsen
1955–1971: Leif Holmen
1972–19??: Arnold Sørhaug
2003-2011: Aina Willumsen (Ap)
2011-2019: Per Pedersen (KrF)
2019–present: Jan Helge Andersen  (Ap)

References

External links

Raser mot vindturbiner til havs i Norges eldste fiskevær: – Vi må ikke bli historieløse [Anger (at proposal for) wind turbines at sea in Norway's oldest fishing village: – We must not lose our history]. 24 November 2020. NRK

Municipal fact sheet from Statistics Norway 
 https://www.youtube.com/watch?v=NyUtSsXspLM

 
Municipalities of Nordland
1872 establishments in Norway